Parliamentary elections were held in Vietnam on 22 May 2016. The members of the National Assembly, which would subsequently appoint the Prime Minister, and deputies of People's Councils at all levels were to be elected.
 
As Vietnam is a one-party state, the ruling Communist Party of Vietnam was the only party to contest the elections.

Background
The election date, a Sunday according to electoral law, was announced on 24 November 2015.

Electoral system
The members of the National Assembly were elected from 184 multi-member constituencies using the two-round system, with a maximum number of 500 candidates to be elected; candidates had to receive at least 50% of the vote in the first round to be elected, with a second round held on a plurality basis.

Campaign
A total of 870 candidates were approved to run for election, including 97 independents and 11 self-nominees.

Results

Initially the Communist Party had 475 elected delegates. However 2 delegates were disqualified from duty before the first meeting of the newly elected National Assembly. Therefore the Communist Party had 473 elected delegates at the end.

References

Elections in Vietnam
Vietnam
2016 in Vietnam
One-party elections
Election and referendum articles with incomplete results
May 2016 events in Vietnam